John Fredrik Hedberg (1 April 1840, Paimio – 12 April 1916) was a Finnish forester, journalist and politician. He was the son of Fredrik Gabriel Hedberg and the elder brother of Reinhold Hedberg. John Hedberg was a Member of the Diet of Finland in 1888 and a Member of the Parliament of Finland from  1908 to 1910 and again from 1911 to 1916, representing the Agrarian League.

References

1840 births
1916 deaths
People from Paimio
People from Turku and Pori Province (Grand Duchy of Finland)
Swedish-speaking Finns
Centre Party (Finland) politicians
Members of the Diet of Finland
Members of the Parliament of Finland (1908–09)
Members of the Parliament of Finland (1909–10)
Members of the Parliament of Finland (1911–13)
Members of the Parliament of Finland (1913–16)